Heliopause may refer to:

 Heliopause (astronomy), the theoretical boundary where the Sun's solar wind is stopped by the interstellar medium.
 Heliopause (band), a U.K. band
 Heliopause (album), a 2011 album by The Resonance Association